In navigation, a state vector is a set of data describing exactly where an object is located in space, and how it is moving.

Mathematical representation
A state vector typically will contain seven elements: three position coordinates, three velocity terms, and the time at which these values were valid. Mathematically, in order to describe positions in a N-dimensional space then a state vector  belongs to :

or simply

Since there is freedom to choose coordinate systems for position, a state vector may also be expressed in a variety of coordinate systems (e.g. the North east down coordinate system).

See also
Orbital state vectors

Navigation